Ivan Jones (10 November 1942 – 22 February 2015) was an Australian rugby league footballer who played in the 1960s and 1970s. Jones was a premiership winning halfback with South Sydney.

Playing career
Originally from Brisbane, Jones was a Souths junior who played four first grade seasons with the South Sydney Rabbitohs between 1965 and 1969.

He won a premiership with South Sydney Rabbitohs, playing half-back in the winning 1967 Grand Final team that defeated Canterbury-Bankstown 12–10.

Ivan Jones also played for Souths in the 1965 Grand Final loss to St. George 12–8. He lost his place in the stellar South Sydney first grade team to Bob Grant in 1968, and he finished his career at Western Suburbs Magpies in 1970.

He was awarded Life Membership of Souths in 2002.

Press reports in 2014 suggested that Ivan Jones was not in good health, but it was reported that he was able to watch his beloved South Sydney Rabbitohs win the 2014 premiership on television in the comfort of his home.

It was reported in the Sydney media that Ivan Jones died on 22 February 2015.

References

1942 births
2015 deaths
South Sydney Rabbitohs players
Western Suburbs Magpies players
Australian rugby league players
Rugby league halfbacks
Rugby league players from Brisbane